Below is a list of SR Lord Nelson class locomotives.  They were named after famous admirals, in recognition of the fact that the Southern Railway served the Royal Navy bases at Portsmouth and Plymouth.

References 

LN list
4-6-0 locomotives
British railway-related lists